Canandaigua Veterans Hospital Historic District is a historic hospital and national historic district located at Canandaigua in Ontario County, New York.  The district includes 29 contributing buildings, 2 contributing sites, and 4 contributing structures.  They were built or utilized during the period 1931 to 1950. The Veterans Administration opened the facility in 1933, as a veteran's neuropsychiatric hospital.  The original hospital buildings built in 1932, include the main building, kitchen / dining hall, acute building, continued treatment building, recreation building, laundry, warehouse, boiler plant, attendant's quarters, sewage pump house, garage, and gatehouse.  The buildings are constructed of brick and feature crenellation, gabled parapets, half-timbering, steeply gabled roofs, and Tudor arches reflective of the Tudor Revival and Jacobethan Revival styles.

It was added to the National Register of Historic Places in 2012.

References

External links
Canandaigua VA Medical Center

Hospital buildings on the National Register of Historic Places in New York (state)
Historic districts on the National Register of Historic Places in New York (state)
Tudor Revival architecture in New York (state)
Hospital buildings completed in 1932
Buildings and structures in Ontario County, New York
National Register of Historic Places in Ontario County, New York